Jethro New (September 20, 1757 – 1825) was an 18th-century American frontiersman and Continental Army soldier during the American Revolutionary War, at one time serving as an aide to General George Washington. He was a prominent settler in North Carolina and Kentucky as well as being among the first families to arrive in Jennings County, Indiana.

Of his twelve children, his son Hickman New was a minister of the Disciples of Christ and his son Robert A. New was the first Indiana Secretary of State following Indiana's admission into the U.S.  His son, John Bowman New, was the father of John C. New, Treasurer of the United States from 1875 to 1876.  His youngest son Jeptha D. New served for one term in the U.S. House of Representatives, where he represented Indiana.

Biography
Born in Kent County, Delaware, he enlisted in the Continental Army during the American Revolutionary War. Serving under Captain Rhodes in the 2nd Delaware Regiment, he saw action at the Battle of Cowpens, the Siege of Yorktown and was present at the execution of British spy Major John André in 1780. Captured by the British at one point, he was tied to a horse and forced to walk several miles on muddy roads. After his release, he became an aide to General George Washington at Valley Forge.

Following the war, he married Sarah Bowman and together had 12 children. After his wife died in 1813, Jethro and his family moved from Gallatin County, Kentucky to Vernon, Indiana. He died there in 1825 and was later buried in the lower part of Vernon Cemetery.

References

1757 births
1825 deaths
Baptists from Kentucky
Continental Army officers from Delaware
Baptists from Delaware
People from Jennings County, Indiana
People from Kent County, Delaware
People from Vernon, Indiana
People of colonial Delaware
Burials in Indiana
Baptists from Indiana